Ryan Scott may refer to: 

 Ryan Scott (cricketer)
 Ryan Scott (footballer, born 1976), English football goalkeeper
 Ryan Scott (soccer, born 1995), Australian football goalkeeper
 Ryan Scott (sprinter) (born 1987), English sprinter
 Ryan Scott (wheelchair rugby) (born 1982), Australian Paralympic wheelchair rugby player

See also
Ryan St. Anne Scott (born 1953), self-proclaimed American traditionalist Catholic priest
Bryan Scott (born 1981), American football player
Brian Scott (disambiguation)